Nemetz is a German surname of Slavic origin that comes from a variation on the Slavic word Němec, meaning "mute" (in this context, ethnic German non-Slavic speakers). It may refer to:

Andreas Nemetz (1799–1846), Moravian bandmaster and composer
Karoline Nemetz (born 1958), Swedish former distance runner
Kurt Nemetz (born 1926), Austrian cyclist
Lenora Nemetz, American theatre actress
Max Nemetz (1886–1971), German film and stage actor.
Nathaniel Nemetz (1913–1997), Canadian lawyer and judge

See also
Nimitz
Niemiec, Polish
Németh, Hungarian
Němec, Czech

German-language surnames
West Slavic-language surnames
Ethnonymic surnames